Caribbean Moonlight is an album by Les Baxter. It was released in 1956 on the Capitol label (catalog no. T-733). In January 1957, it reached the No. 5 spot on Billboard magazine's "Pop Instrumentals" chart.

AllMusic later gave the album a rating of four stars. Reviewer Jason Akeny wrote that "its melodies move with the hypnotic beauty and sway of moonbeams flickering across the water's surface, while its supple, exotic rhythms conjure a nearly mystical paradise of palm trees, sandy beaches, and cool breezes."

Track listing
Side 1
 "Taboo" (Marguerita Lecana, Al Stillman)
 "Deep Night" (Charlie Henderson, Rudy Vallee)
 "The Breeze and I" (Ernesto Lecuana, Al Stillman)
 "Nightingale" (Xavier Cugat, George Rosner)
 "Temptation" (Nacio Herb Brown, Arthur Freed)
 "Poinciana" (Simon, Bernier, Lliso)

Side 2
 "Ay, Ay, Ay" (Osman Perez Freire)
 "Adios" (Enric Madriguera)
 "Carnival" (Harry Warren, Bob Russell)
 "Green Eyes" (Nilo Menendez)
 "Out of This World" (Harold Arlen, Johnny Mercer)
 "Sway (Quien Sera)" (Pablo Beltran Ruiz-Norman Gimbel)

References

1956 albums
Capitol Records albums
Les Baxter albums